14 Sagittae is a binary star system in the equatorial constellation of Aquila. 14 Sagittae is the Flamsteed designation. It appears as a sixth magnitude star, near the lower limit of visibility to the naked eye, having an apparent visual magnitude of 5.89. It is moving closer to the Earth with a heliocentric radial velocity of –22 km/s.

This is a single-lined spectroscopic binary with an orbital period of 61.5 days and an eccentricity of 0.49. It is narrow-lined with a projected rotational velocity of 7 km/s. The star is radiating 292 times the Sun's luminosity from its photosphere at an effective temperature of 13,200 K.

References

External links
 HR 7664
 Image 14 Sagittae

Mercury-manganese stars
Spectroscopic binaries
Aquila (constellation)
BD+15 4033
Sagittae, 14
190229
098754
7664
B-type giants